This uniform polyhedron compound is a composition of 5 rhombicuboctahedra, in the same vertex arrangement (i.e. sharing vertices with) the compound of 5 stellated truncated hexahedra.

References 
.

Polyhedral compounds